Antonio Collalto (1713 – 5 July 1778) was an Italian actor and writer, mainly of comedies in Commedia dell'arte style.

Collalto was born in Florence.  As a young man, he was  a soldier, but he afterwards became an actor, often playing the masked role of Pantalone. He also wrote many plays for his theater including  il Pantalone avaro (The Jealous Pantalone); il Pantalone ringiovanito (The Rejuvenated Pantalone); la Famiglia in Discordia (The Family in Discord); il Pantalone padre severo (Pantalone the Strict Father); il Ritorno il'Argentina (The Return from Argentina); and finally Tre gemelli veneziani (Three Venetian Twins); in four acts from 1775. This latter comedy was very popular and was translated into French. Collalto would play the parts of all three twins. He was applauded as a comedic actor for Italian plays in Paris.

Sources

18th-century Italian male actors
Italian male stage actors
1713 births
1778 deaths
Commedia dell'arte
Writers from Florence
Italian dramatists and playwrights
Actors from Florence